Kriel is an Afrikaans surname. Notable people with the surname include:

Anneline Kriel, South African model and actress
Ashley Kriel (1966–1987), South African activist
Hernus Kriel (1941–2015), first Premier of the Western Cape province
James Kriel, (1942–2016) former South African Air Force Chief
Jesse Kriel (born 1994), South African rugby player
Marianne Kriel (born 1971), former backstroke and freestyle swimmer from South Africa
Deejay Kriel (born 1995), South African professional boxer

See also

Kariel
Kriel, Mpumalanga, South Africa

Surnames of German origin
Afrikaans-language surnames
South African families